Eduardo Cruz-Coke Lassabe (April 22, 1899 – March 18, 1974) was a Chilean political figure, the conservative candidate in Chile's 1946 presidential election and the principal creator of the Chilean health system.

Cruz-Coke was born in Valparaíso, Chile, the son of Ricardo Cruz-Coke and of Celeste Lassabe. He completed his secondary studies at the Padres Franceses in Santiago, and later graduated as a medical doctor from the Universidad de Chile in 1921.  While still a student, Cruz-Coke together with classmate Emilio Tizzoni, founded the National Association of Catholic Students (ANEC) based on the Catholic social teachings. Cruz-Coke became its first president, and in 1920 he joined the Conservative party.

After working as a microscopy assistant to professor Juan Noé, in 1925 he became professor of physiology and pathology at the same university, a position he retained until 1955. The same year, he travelled to Berlin to a sexology congress and remained in Europe studying for a year. At his return, he founded the Society of Biology of Santiago in 1928. Between 1927 and 1937 he was Chief of Medicine at the San Juan de Dios Hospital.

Between 1937 and 1938 Cruz-Coke served as Minister of Public Health, Social Assistance and Welfare appointed by President Arturo Alessandri. During his tenure, Cruz-Coke implemented a health program based upon a strictly scientific (as opposed to politic) approach to tackle the main health challenges, particularly maternal and infant mortality. He was the force behind Law 6026 (for Mother and Child) and Law 6174 (of Preventive Medicine). He set up a "National Food Council" that defined innovative policies to improve the alimentary weaknesses, particularly among the low-income sectors, and organized the Preventive Medicine Services to diminish labour sickness. The measures had a positive impact in Public Health indexes and were followed by its successors.

In 1941, Cruz-Coke was elected a senator for Santiago and was reelected in 1949. In 1946, he was proclaimed presidential candidate by the Conservative party, but a split of his voting base between him and Fernando Alessandri resulted in the triumph of Gabriel González Videla, with Cruz-Coke finishing in second place. In 1948, Cruz-Coke founded the Social Christian Conservative Party.

After the end of his senatorial term in 1957, he decided not to run for reelection. In 1958 he was named Ambassador to Peru, where he remained until 1960. In 1963 he was named the first president of the newly established National Committee on Atomic Energy, and in 1965 produced the first plan for the use of nuclear power in the mining industries of the north of Chile.  He died in Santiago, in 1974, at the age of 74.

See also
1946 Chilean presidential election

External links 
 Public Health policies and Ministers 
 Some biographies of famous Chilean doctors 

1899 births
1974 deaths
People from Valparaíso
Cruz Family
Chilean people of Italian descent
Chilean Roman Catholics
Conservative Party (Chile) politicians
Social Christian Conservative Party politicians
Chilean Ministers of Health
Senators of the XXXIX Legislative Period of the National Congress of Chile
Senators of the XL Legislative Period of the National Congress of Chile
Candidates for President of Chile
Ambassadors of Chile to Peru
Chilean diplomats
University of Chile alumni